Umm El Qaʻāb (sometimes romanised Umm El Gaʻab) is a necropolis of the Early Dynastic Period kings at Abydos, Egypt. Its modern name means "Mother of Pots" as the whole area is littered with the broken pot shards of offerings made in earlier times. The cultic ancient name of the area was (w-)pkr or (rꜣ-)pkr "District of the pkr[-tree]" (an unidentified species) or "Opening of the pkr[-tree]" (Coptic: upoke), belonging to tꜣ-dsr "the secluded/cleared land" (necropolis) or crk-hh "Binding of Eternity" (Coptic: Alkhah).

The area was a site of veneration and worship in ancient Egypt, and by the time of the Middle Kingdom, at least one of the royal tombs was excavated and rebuilt for the priests of Osiris.

The tombs of this area were first excavated by Émile Amélineau in the 1890s and more systematically by Flinders Petrie between 1899 and 1901. Since then the area has been excavated repeatedly by the German Archaeological Institute since the 1970s, which has allowed for a thorough reconstruction of the original layout and appearance of these tombs.

Pre-dynastic tombs

 U-j: Unknown ruler, but possibly Scorpion I  found in tomb, also possible pre dynastic ruler Bull is attested in one of the ivory tablets.
 B1/B2: Iry-Hor
 B7/B9: Ka

First Dynasty tombs
Known as Cemetery B, this area contains the Early Dynastic tombs of the pharaohs of the First Dynasty of Egypt and the last two kings of the Second Dynasty.

 B17/B18: Narmer
 B10/B15/B19: Aha
 O: Djer
 Z: Djet
 Y: Merneith
 T: Den
 X: Anedjib
 U: Semerkhet
 Q: Qa'a

Second Dynasty tombs
The last two kings of the Second Dynasty returned to be buried near to their ancestors—they also revived the practice of building mud-brick funerary enclosures nearby.

 P: Peribsen. A seal found in this tomb contains the first full sentence written in hieroglyphs.
 V: Khasekhemwy. This tomb was on a massive scale, with several interconnecting mud-brick chambers, and the actual burial chamber being constructed of dressed limestone blocks. When excavated by Petrie in 1901 it contained a scepter made from sard and banded with gold, limestone vases with golden covers, and a ewer and basin of bronze.

Human sacrifice and 1st Dynasty tombs
Human sacrifice was practiced as part of the funerary rituals associated with the First Dynasty. The tomb of Djer is associated with the burials of 338 individuals thought to have been sacrificed. The people and animals sacrificed, such as asses, were expected to assist the pharaoh in the afterlife. It appears that Djer's courtiers were strangled and their tombs all closed at the same time. For unknown reasons, this practice ended with the conclusion of the dynasty, with shabtis taking the place of actual people to aid the pharaohs with the work expected of them in the afterlife.

References

External links
 

Abydos, Egypt sites
Tombs of ancient Egypt
Cemeteries in Egypt